Theatre of the Mind is the first studio album by the Canadian rock band Mystery, released in 1996. It is also the first album to be released on Michel St-Père's record label Unicorn Records, which was created to promote this album. There was a major lineup shift following the release of this album - not only was it the last Mystery album to feature Richard Addison and Stéphane Perreault, it was also the only album to feature Michel Painchaud and the last album until 2010 to feature Benoît Dupuis.

A remix of the album was released in October 2018 which includes bonus track.

Release

Reissues
When the album was first reissued in 1998 the composition of the artwork was redone by drummer Stéphane Perreault, changing the setting to a desert. The music remained unchanged.

When the 16 track 2 inch master tapes were transferred to digital files for the 2018 edition of the album, two additional songs were on the tapes that were not released on the original album: a rerecorded version of "Heart of Stone", which was included as a bonus track on the rerelease, and another recording of "In my Dreams", both of which were originally recorded for the Mystery EP.

The album was also released on vinyl by Oskar records.

Track listing

Personnel
Mystery
 Gary Savoie - lead and background vocals
 Michel St-Père - electric guitar, 6 & 12 string guitars, classical guitar and synthesizers
 Stéphane Perreault - drums, percussion, drum programming, glockenspiel and synthesizers
 Benoît Dupuis - keyboards
 Michel Painchaud - classical and acoustic guitars
 Richard Addison - fretted and fretless bass guitars

Additional musicians
 Patrick  Bourque - bass
 Patrice  Bédard - keyboard
 Sylvain  Langlois - tenor and soprano saxophones
 Pierre  Léger - flutes
 Josée  Larivière - background vocals
 Marie-Claude  Masse - violin
 Marie  Lacasse - violin
 Ahimsa  Gilbert - cello
 Serge Gangloff - special FX synthesizer
 Gilles Peltier - special FX and synthesizer programming

Release information
 CD - Unicorn Records - UNCR-2002 - 1996
 CD - Unicorn Records - UNCR-2020 - 1998
 CD - Unicorn Digital - UNCR-5122 - 2018
 Vinyl - Oskar - 012LP - 2019

References

1996 albums
Mystery (band) albums